The King Alfonso XIII Professorship of Spanish Studies is a named chair at the University of Oxford. It was established in 1927 by the endowment of £25,000 raised by the Lord Mayor of London and a special committee he chaired for the purpose. The gift was conditional on the university paying £600 a year to maintain a lecturer and a departmental library. It is associated with a fellowship at Exeter College, Oxford (which does not pay a stipend).

List of professors 
 1928–1931: Salvador de Madariaga
 1932–1952: William James Entwistle, FBA.
 1953–1981: Sir Peter Edward Lionel Russell, FBA, FRHistS.
 1982–2003: Ian David Lewis Michael, FKC.
 2003–2017: Edwin Henry Williamson
 2018–present: Jonathan William Thacker.

References 

Professorships at the University of Oxford